Lumenera Corporation, a division of Teledyne Technologies, Inc. is a developer and manufacturer of imaging devices such as  digital cameras for industrial, scientific and surveillance applications. It further offers customization and original equipment manufacturer (OEM) services for specialized application.

It offers products featuring both CMOS and  CCD sensors, equipped with USB, Ethernet and HDMI connections.

References

External links
 

Cameras
Canadian brands
Manufacturing companies based in Ottawa